Feigeria scops is a species of moth from the genus Feigeria. It is known from Trinidad.

Feigeria scops resembles Feigera alauda, but the latter has a smaller wing span and is less variable in appearance than F. scops.

References

Thermesiini
Moths described in 1852
Taxa named by Achille Guenée
Moths of the Caribbean